Paul-Joseph de Montgolfier (28 April 1913 – 8 November 1942) was a French fighter pilot, flying Curtiss 75 Hawks with the GC II/5 fighter group when World War II began.

De Montgolfier was born in Saint-Marcel-d'Ardèche, France. On 6 November 1939, Paul de Montgolfier and 8 other pilots were escorting bombers over the Sarre region when they were jumped by 27 Messerschmitt fighters of JGr 102. The French pilots scored 5 victories (and another 5 probable victories, including one shot down by Montgolfier) for the loss of only two of their own. This fight - known as the "9 against 27" fight was to become legendary and Hannes Gentzen, the CO of JGr 102, was summoned back to Berlin and threatened with court-martial for such disastrous results.

Montgolfier went on top score more victories until the Nazi invasion of France : he was shot down on 15 May 1940 and wounded. He was credited with 5 aerial victories. After recovering, he went back to active service and was killed in action fighting the Allied landing at Casablanca on 8 November 1942.

List of aerial victories
1. Bf 109; 06 Nov 39 - Probable, shared with Lt Trémolet

2. He 111; 23 Nov 39 - Destroyed, shared with Sgt Audrain, Sgt Bouhy and 3 RAF pilots. Over Boulay.

3. Do 17; 02 Mar 40 - Probable, shared with A/C Gras, S/C Janebas

4. Bf 109; 10 May 40 - Destroyed over Luxemburg.

5. ??

Awards
 Légion d'Honneur
Médaille Militaire
Croix de Guerre avec palme

1913 births
1942 deaths
French Air and Space Force personnel
French World War II flying aces
French military personnel of World War II
French military personnel killed in World War II
Recipients of the Legion of Honour
Recipients of the Croix de Guerre (France)
Aviators killed by being shot down